Mikkel Hansen (born 22 October 1987) is a Danish handball player for Aalborg Håndbold and the Danish national team.

Widely regarded as one of the greatest players of all time, Hansen has won the IHF World Player of the Year a record-tying three times.

Career
He was voted as the IHF World Player of the Year in 2011, 2015 and 2018 by the International Handball Federation.

He joined FC Barcelona Handbol in June 2008. He previously played for Danish Handball League club GOG, with whom he won the Danish championship in 2007. On 2 June 2010 he returned to Denmark, to play for AG København, after two years of playing in Spain. After two years and two championships, the club folded in 2012 with Hansen joining the newly formed French team PSG Handball. He played for PSG for ten seasons, before going back to Denmark and Aalborg Håndbold.

Mikkel Hansen is an Olympic Champion, a World Champion, and European Champion with the Danish national team, winning the 2016 title in Rio de Janeiro, the 2019 title in Denmark, and 2012 title in Serbia. He was also selected into the All-Star team of the tournament as the best left back. In 2011 he was a part of the Danish team that finished second in the World Championships in Sweden. He was the tournament's overall top goal scorer.

In 2019, he led Denmark to their first-ever World Championships win. He became the top scorer and MVP of the tournament. Later same year he was named the best in the world for the third time of his career.

In 2021 he yet again won the World Championship with Denmark, and was selected both as the best left back and as MVP.

In the 2020 Olympics, where Denmark got a silver medal, he was again chosen as the best left back, and he became the top goalscorer with 61 goals. With those 61 goals he broke the record of most scored goals in one men's olympic handball tournament. During the tournament he also became the number one goalscorer ever in the men's handball olympics, with a total of 165 goals.

Personal life
His father  played for the Danish national handball team, where he played 120 national team matches, scored 240 goals and participated in the 1984 Summer Olympics.

He married Stephanie Gundelach in 2020. The couple have two sons, Eddie Max born in January 2019, and Vince born in May 2021.

Individual awards
IHF World Player of the Year – Men: 2011, 2015, 2018
Handball-Planet – Best World Handball Player: 2016, 2019, 2021
Most Valuable Player (MVP) of the Olympic Games: 2016
Most Valuable Player (MVP) of the World Championship: 2013, 2019, 2021
Most Valuable Player (MVP) of the LNH Division 1: 2016
Top Goalscorer of the Olympic Games: 2020
Top Goalscorer of the World Championship: 2011, 2019
Top Goalscorer of the EHF Champions League: 2012, 2016
Top Goalscorer of the LNH Division 1: 2015, 2016
All-Star Left back of the Olympic Games: 2016, 2020
All-Star Left back of the World Championship: 2011, 2021
All-Star Left back of the European Championship: 2012, 2014, 2018, 2022
All-Star Left back of the EHF Champions League: 2017, 2019, 2021
All-Star Playmaker of the EHF Champions League: 2014, 2015, 2020

Honours

Club
French Championship:
Winners: 2013, 2015, 2016, 2017, 2018, 2019, 2020, 2021, 2022
Runners-up: 2013–14
Coupe de France
Winners: 2013–14, 2014–15, 2017–18, 2020–21, 2021–22
Runners-up: 2012–13, 2015–16
Coupe de la Ligue
Winners: 2016–17, 2017–18, 2018–19
Runners-up: 2015–16
Trophée des Champions
Winners: 2014, 2015, 2016, 2019
Runners-up: 2017
Danish Championship:
Winners: 2007, 2011, 2012
Runners-up: 2006, 2008
Danish Cup:
Winners: 2005, 2010, 2011
Runners-up: 2007, 2008
Danish super Cup:
Winners: 2022
Spanish Championship:
Runners-up:  2009, 2010
ASOBAL Cup:
Winners: 2010
Runners-up: 2009
Spanish Supercup:
Winners: 2009, 2010
Spanish Cup:
Winners: 2009, 2010
EHF Champions League
Runners-up: 2016–17 
Third place: 2011–12, 2017–18, 2019–20
IHF Super Globe
Runners-up: 2016

International
Olympics:
: 2016
: 2020
World championship:
: 2019, 2021, 2023
: 2011, 2013
European championship:
: 2012
:  2014
:  2022

See also
List of handballers with 1000 or more international goals

References

External links
Barcelona profile

1987 births
Living people
Liga ASOBAL players
FC Barcelona Handbol players
Danish male handball players
Olympic handball players of Denmark
Handball players at the 2008 Summer Olympics
Handball players at the 2012 Summer Olympics
Handball players at the 2016 Summer Olympics
People from Helsingør
Danish expatriate sportspeople in France
Danish expatriate sportspeople in Spain
Expatriate handball players
Medalists at the 2016 Summer Olympics
Olympic gold medalists for Denmark
Olympic medalists in handball
Handball players at the 2020 Summer Olympics
Medalists at the 2020 Summer Olympics
Olympic silver medalists for Denmark
Sportspeople from the Capital Region of Denmark
Aalborg Håndbold players